Top-seed Virginia Ruzici won the final and $24,000 first prize money by defeating seventh-seeded Helena Suková in the final.

Seeds
The top eight seeds received a bye into the second round. A champion seed is indicated in bold text while text in italics indicates the round in which that seed was eliminated.

  Virginia Ruzici (champion)
  Kathy Rinaldi (semifinals)
  Zina Garrison (third round)
  Bonnie Gadusek (semifinals)
  Pam Casale (second round)
  JoAnne Russell (second round)
  Helena Suková (final)
  Lee Duk-hee (quarterfinals)
  Catherine Tanvier (third round)
  Ivanna Madruga-Osses (third round)
  Dianne Fromholtz (quarterfinals)
  Lisa Bonder-Kreiss (third round)
  Susan Mascarin (quarterfinals)
  Leigh-Anne Thompson (second round)

Draw

Finals

Top half

Section 1

Section 2

Bottom half

Section 3

Section 4

References

External links

U.S. Clay Court Championships
1982 U.S. Clay Court Championships